Glenlock is an unincorporated community in Anderson County, Kansas, United States.

History
A post office was opened in Glenlock (formerly spelled Glenloch) in 1887, and remained in operation until it was discontinued in 1913.

References

Further reading

External links
 Anderson County maps: Current, Historic, KDOT

Unincorporated communities in Anderson County, Kansas
Unincorporated communities in Kansas